The 1942–43 Nationalliga A season was the fifth season of the Nationalliga A, the top level of ice hockey in Switzerland. Seven teams participated in the league, and HC Davos won the championship.

Standings

External links
 Championnat de Suisse 1942/43

Swiss
National League (ice hockey) seasons
1942–43 in Swiss ice hockey